Dinan Cars designs and manufactures aftermarket performance parts for BMW automobiles. The company was founded in 1979 by Steve Dinan and is headquartered in Opelika, Alabama.

Its performance parts are marketed through a network of authorized BMW dealers, independent auto repair shops, and their website. Dinan-modified vehicles retain factory warranty coverage and qualify for BMW's Certified Pre-Owned program. 180 locations in the United States sell Dinan parts or cars, including 150 BMW dealerships.

Until 2006, Dinan designed and manufactured the Mini Cooper line performance parts. In addition, Dinan had a history of building BMW racing engines for teams competing in the Grand-Am Rolex Sports Car Series Daytona Prototype class up until 2013.

History 

Dinan was founded in 1979 by Steven Dinan, an engineering student at the time. It was incorporated in 1982 as Bavarian Performance, Inc. in Morgan Hill, California. In 1988 it was renamed Dinan Engineering, Inc.

In 2013, Steve Dinan sold Dinan to Driven Performance Brands, a private equity group. 

In 2015, Steve Dinan left the company. He was succeeded as president by Brian Applegate.

In 2018, Dinan relocated from Morgan Hill, California, to Opelika, Alabama, as part of a consolidation plan.

Power Packages

E92  M3 
Power Package 2 
 Deck Lid Badge
 Performance Engine Software
 Free Flow Exhaust
 High Flow Carbon Fiber Intake
 High Flow Throttle Bodies
 Underdrive Pulley Kit

F87  M2 
Power Package S2 
 Deck Lid Badge
 Performance Engine Software
 Turbo
 Free Flow Exhaust
 High Flow Carbon Fiber Intake
 Coil-Over Suspension
 Pedal Cover Set
 Sway Bar Set
 Rear Suspension Link Kit
 Dual Core Intercooler

References

External links
Dinan website
Dinan Supercharged M3 test drive article

 Automotive companies of the United States
 Automotive motorsports and performance companies
BMW in motorsport
 Auto tuning companies
 American racecar constructors